Harold Miller may refer to:

Harold Miller (bishop) (born 1950), Church of Ireland bishop
Harold Miller (footballer) (1902–1988), Chelsea and England footballer
Harold Miller (librarian) (1898–1989), New Zealand lecturer, librarian and writer
Hal Miller (actor), American stage and television actor
USCGC Harold Miller, United States Coast Guard cutter
Harold Miller (USCG), Coast Guard seaman awarded a Silver Star, namesake of the cutter

See also
Harry Miller (disambiguation)
Harold Millar, Scottish graphic artist